Jim Kouf (born July 24, 1951) is an American screenwriter, director, and producer. He received the 1988 Edgar Award for Best Motion Picture Screenplay for his work on Stakeout (1987).

Filmography

Film
The Boogens (with David O'Malley) (1981) (credited as "Bob Hunt")
Wacko (with David Greenwalt, Dana Olsen and Michael Spound) (1982)
Pink Motel (1982)
Utilities (with David Greenwalt) (1983)
Class (with David Greenwalt) (1983)
Up the Creek (1984)
American Dreamer (with David Greenwalt) (1984)
Secret Admirer (with David Greenwalt) (1985)
Shaker Run (with Henry Fownes and Bruce Morrison) (1986)
Miracles (1986) (also director)
Stakeout (1987) (also producer)
The Hidden (1987) (credited as "Bob Hunt")
Disorganized Crime (1989) (also director)
Another Stakeout (1993)
Operation Dumbo Drop (with Gene Quintano) (1995)
Gang Related (1997) (also director/producer)
Rush Hour (with Ross LaManna) (1998)
Snow Dogs (with Tommy Swerdlow, Michael Goldberg and Phillip Halprin) (2002)
Taxi (with Robert Ben Garant and Thomas Lennon) (2004)
National Treasure (with The Wibberleys) (2004)
A Fork in the Road (2009) (also director)
Money for Nothing (2012)
Money Monster (2016)

Television
White Water Rebels (1983) (TV) (also co-producer)
Last of The Great Survivors (1984) (TV)
Angel (2000–2001) 
The Handler (2003) 
Ghost Whisperer (2006–2007) 
Grimm (2011–2017) (also co-creator)

References

External links

1951 births
Living people
American male screenwriters
American film producers
American film directors
Edgar Award winners